Harvey A. Moyer (1853 – October 9, 1935) was born in Clay, New York, and founded the H. A. Moyer Carriage Company in Cicero, New York, in 1876. The company relocated to Syracuse, New York, in 1880 and later changed assembly to luxury automobiles in 1908 and was renamed the H. A. Moyer Automobile Company. After discontinuing production of the Moyer Car in 1915, Moyer incorporated the business, H. A. Moyer, Inc., and became a dealer for Velie automobiles and Stearns-Knight automobiles. Stearns-Knight operated for only a short time before merging with Willys-Overland. He was buried at Woodlawn Cemetery (Syracuse, NY), Section 25, Plot 10

Moyer inventions 

Moyer applied for several patents on various devices between the years 1882 and 1898. The list of patents includes:

 1882:  Hub-boring machine
 1884:  Pleasure-cart
 1887:  Spring-vehicle
 1892:  Hub-boring machine
 1893:  Folding seat for carriages
 1893:  Bolster-plate
 1893:  Spring-vehicle
 1896:  Design for a sleigh
 1896:  Hub-boring machine
 1897:  Thill-coupling (along with C. J. Graf)
 1898:  Noiseless king bolt
 1898:  Spring-vehicle
 1899:  Self-oiling axle
 1899:  Moyers 30 Day Axle Grease

References

External links 

H. A. Moyer U.S. Patents
H. A. Moyer USA 1915 supreme speed 80 km /h
Harvey Allen Moyer grave at Woodlawn Cemetery (Syracuse, New York)
CNY Heritage - Central New York Library Resources Council, 2009

Businesspeople from Syracuse, New York
1853 births
1935 deaths
People from Clay, New York
People from Cicero, New York
Burials at Woodlawn Cemetery (Syracuse, New York)
People from Bridgeport, New York